Tõnu Mikiver (2 August 1943 Loksa – 21 March 2017 Tallinn) was an Estonian actor.

Career
In 1965 he graduated from the Tallinn State Conservatory's Performing Arts Department. From 1965 until 1977, he worked at Estonian Youth Theatre and from 1977 until 2007, at the Estonian Drama Theatre. Besides theatre roles he has played also in several films.

Family
His older brother was an actor Mikk Mikiver.

Selected filmography

 1980: Metskannikesed (feature film; roll: Anti)
 1995: Tallinna legendid (animated film; in role: voice)
 2008: Tuulepealne maa (television series; in role: Einar Soodla)
 2010: Punane elavhõbe (feature film; in role: Eduard Janovitš)
 2012: Eestlanna Pariisis (feature film; in role: Endel)

References

1943 births
2017 deaths
Estonian male stage actors
Estonian male film actors
Estonian male television actors
20th-century Estonian male actors
21st-century Estonian male actors
Estonian Academy of Music and Theatre alumni
People from Loksa
Soviet male actors